Paraburkholderia madseniana is a Gram-negative bacterium belonging to the genus Paraburkholderia. The type strain is P. madseniana RP11T, which was isolated from forest soil near Ithaca, NY, in 2016. The species was named in honor of Gene Madsen, a Professor at Cornell University, in recognition of his contributions to the field of environmental microbiology. The species is notable for its capacity to degrade phenolic compounds and its involvement in the priming effect.

References 

madseniana